Andrew Livingstone may refer to:

Andrew Livingstone (footballer), English soccer player
Andrew Livingstone, producer of Bamboo
Andrew Livingston (actor), British character actor, starred in 1997 film The Full Monty

See also
Andrew Livingston (born 1978), American swimmer
Andy Livingston (born 1944), American football player